Isobel Ross is a former Scottish curler.

She is a champion of the first-ever European Curling Championships, played .

Teams

References

External links
 

Living people
Scottish female curlers
European curling champions
Scottish curling champions
Year of birth missing (living people)